Kevin Kranz (born 20 June 1998) is a German sprinter. He won a gold medal in the 4 × 100 metres relay at the 2019 European U23 Championships. Earlier that year, he made the final at the 2019 European Indoor Championships in Birmingham finishing eighth.

International competitions

1Did not start in the final

Personal bests
Outdoor
100 metres – 10.24 (+1.6 m/s, Heilbronn 2018)
200 metres – 20.89 (+2.0 m/s, Heilbronn 2018)

Indoor
60 metres – 6.52 (Dortmund 2021)
200 metres – 22.77 (Hanau 2016)

References

External links

1998 births
Living people
German male sprinters
Sportspeople from Frankfurt
Eintracht Frankfurt athletes